Petra Dizdar (born 29 June 1984) is a Croatian former professional tennis player.

Dizdar, a native of Split, qualified for her only WTA Tour singles main draw at the 2003 Croatian Bol Ladies Open and fell in the first round to the third-seeded Vera Zvonareva. She played collegiate tennis for the University of Texas, where she was named Big 12 Freshman of the Year in 2004 and earned All-Big 12 selection three times as a singles player.

ITF finals

Singles: 1 (0–1)

Doubles: 3 (1–2)

References

External links
 
 

1984 births
Living people
Croatian female tennis players
Texas Longhorns women's tennis players
Tennis players from Split, Croatia
21st-century Croatian women